is a judoka from Japan, who won the gold medal in the Open Class at the 1976 Summer Olympics in Montreal. In the final of the Olympic tournament in Canada he defeated Great Britain's Keith Remfry.
In 2009 he was elected President of Kodokan and he was awarded the rank of 9th dan.

References

External links
 

1951 births
Living people
Japanese male judoka
Olympic judoka of Japan
Judoka at the 1976 Summer Olympics
Olympic gold medalists for Japan
People from Uki, Kumamoto
Sportspeople from Kumamoto Prefecture
Olympic medalists in judo
Medalists at the 1976 Summer Olympics